Janni is both a given name and a surname. Notable people with the name include:

 Janni Arnth Jensen (born 1986), Danish football player
 Janni Howker, British author
 Janni Lee Simner, American author
 Janni Spies, Danish businesswoman
 Antonio Janni (1904-1987), Italian soccer player
 Guglielmo Janni (1892-1958), Italian painter
 Joseph Janni (1916-1994), British film producer
 Peter Janni known for Janni's chimney in Northport, Washington, United States
Janni Serra (born 1998), German football player

See also 
 Jann (Dungeons & Dragons), fictional characters
 Jannis
 Gianni
 Yanni (disambiguation)
 Jani (disambiguation)
 Jaani (disambiguation)
 Jannie
 Alternate forms for the name John